Samuel McIntire Taylor was a Republican politician in the Ohio House of Representatives and Ohio Secretary of State from 1893-1897.

Samuel Taylor was born July 24, 1856 in Champaign County, Ohio. He attended country schools and graduated from Ohio Wesleyan University in 1882, where he was Phi Gamma Delta, and the Cincinnati Law School, where he graduated in 1884. He located in Urbana, Ohio, where he practiced. He was elected in 1887 to represent Champaign County in the 68th General Assembly, and re-elected 1889 and 1891 to the 69th and 70th, from which he resigned. He resigned when elected in 1892 to Ohio Secretary of State, and then was re-elected in 1894.

After leaving office in 1897, Taylor was appointed consul to Glasgow, Scotland, by President McKinley. He was transferred to Callao, Peru in 1906, and served there until 1910. He was appointed consul to Birmingham, England, in 1913, and served there until his death from influenza in that city, December 7, 1916. He was buried at Oak Dale Cemetery in Urbana.

Notes

References

Secretaries of State of Ohio
People from Champaign County, Ohio
Ohio lawyers
1856 births
Republican Party members of the Ohio House of Representatives
Ohio Wesleyan University alumni
American diplomats
1916 deaths
University of Cincinnati College of Law alumni
19th-century American politicians
People from Urbana, Ohio
19th-century American lawyers